Escuela de Aviación Militar Airport  is a military airport located 6 nm west-southwest of Córdoba, Córdoba, Argentina.

See also
List of airports in Argentina

References

External links 
 Airport record for Escuela de Aviación Militar Airport at Landings.com
 

Airports in Argentina
Córdoba Province, Argentina